Feng Lanzhou (24 August 1903 – 29 January 1972) was a Chinese entomologist who was director of the Institute of Parasitic Diseases, Chinese Academy of Medical Sciences from 1958 to 1960. He was an academician of the Chinese Academy of Sciences.

Biography 
Feng was born in the town of Jiangyu, in Linqu County, Shandong, on 24 August 1903. He secondary studied at Shoushan High School. In 1920, he was admitted to Cheeloo University, majoring in medical science. Between 1925 and 1927, he was assistant for the Kala-Azar Delegation of the Royal Society in Jinan. 

After university, he was hired by Peking Union Medical College as an assistant. In 1932, he first identified anopheles minimus as the main vector of malaria in southern China. In August 1933, he went to study at the Liverpool School of Tropical Health in England for half a year. In 1936, he published the survey results of filariasis in China, which proved for the first time that anopheles hyrcanus var.sinensis was an important vector of Malay filariasis in China. In 1941, after the Pearl Harbor Incident, Peking Union Medical College was closed by the Imperial Japanese Army. He joined the faculty the Department of Parasitology, Peking University Medical College as the chief professor, and served as a researcher in the Pharmaceutical Factory affiliated to Tianjin East Asia Wool Weaving Factory to study the purification of effective components of areca catechu. When Peking Union Medical College was officially reopened to the public in 1947, he was recalled to the original department, becoming associate professor in 1947 and to full professor in 1952. He became director of the Institute of Parasitic Diseases, Chinese Academy of Medical Sciences in 1958, then returned to Peking Union Medical College in 1960, working there until his death in 1972.

On 29 January 1972, he died of illness in Beijing, aged 68.

Honours and awards 
 1957 Member of the Chinese Academy of Sciences (CAS)

References

External links 
Feng Lanzhou on the official website of the Chinese Academy of Sciences 

1903 births
1972 deaths
People from Linqu County
Scientists from Shandong
Cheeloo University alumni
Academic staff of Peking Union Medical College
Chinese entomologists
Members of the Chinese Academy of Sciences